Fabrizzyo César Alves de Azevedo, better known simply as Fabrizzyo (born 10 January 1989) is a Brazilian footballer. He currently plays for Paulista Futebol Clube.

After going on loan from Paulista in his native Brazil, he made his debut and scored for Lausanne-Sport on 16 March 2011 against Nyon in a league match. He later returned to Paulista at the end of the season.

External links
 Career history at ASF
 
 

1989 births
Living people
Brazilian footballers
Brazilian expatriate footballers
FC Lausanne-Sport players
Paulista Futebol Clube players
Association football midfielders